Donald Weber is a literary critic and a specialist in Jewish American literature and film studies. He is the Lucia, Ruth, and Elizabeth MacGregor Professor of English and Chair of the English department at Mount Holyoke College.

Background
Weber received his B.A. from State University of New York at Stony Brook and an M.A. and Ph.D. from Columbia University. He joined Mount Holyoke in 1981.

Publications
 Haunted in the New World. Indiana University Press, 2005. . The book's subtitle, Jewish American Culture from Cahan to The Goldbergs, reflects its broad scope as a review of Jewish-American literature and popular culture.

See also
 American literature

References

External links
 Weber's profile at Mount Holyoke College

Literary critics of English
Stony Brook University alumni
American literary critics
Jewish American writers
Mount Holyoke College faculty
Columbia University alumni
Year of birth missing (living people)
Living people
Jewish cinema
21st-century American Jews